Climate Week NYC is an event that has taken place every year in New York City since 2009. The summit takes place alongside the UN General Assembly and brings together international leaders from business, government and civil society to showcase global climate action. Climate Week NYC is run by The Climate Group. Climate Week NYC is the largest of a number of Climate Week events that take place around the world throughout the year including Africa, Latin America & Caribbean, Asia Pacific and Middle East Climate Week Events.

History

The first Climate Week took place in 2009 and in 2018 celebrated its tenth year in the city. Climate Week NYC takes place while the United Nations General Assembly is in session, allowing heads of state and other senior governmental figures to attend and participate. In 2018 several heads of state took part in the Opening Ceremony including New Zealand Prime Minister Jacinda Ardern as well as the Presidents of Haiti, Peru and the Marshall Islands.

In 2020 Climate Week NYC turned into a virtual event due to the global Covid-19 coronavirus pandemic and was the largest climate summit to take place in 2020. In a keynote address opening the event Prince Charles said, "Without swift and immediate action, at an unprecedented pace and scale, we will miss the window of opportunity to 'reset' for... a more sustainable and inclusive future."

In 2014 Secretary-General Ban Ki-moon hosted the UN Climate Summit and joined the Opening Ceremony with John Kerry, US Secretary of State, Tim Cook, CEO of Apple and Christiana Figueres, Executive Secretary of UNFCCC.

Format

Climate Week NYC events

Each year Climate Week NYC hosts a number of events throughout the week. In 2018 over 150 events registered as part of the week, with many other taking place in an unofficial capacity.

In 2019 all Climate Week NYC events were categorized alongside nine UN "tracks" to recognize the week's alignment with the United Nations Secretary Generals' Climate Action Summit. This included a Youth and Social Activism Program, run in partnership with the social action charity Global Citizen. Over 350 events took place as part of Climate Week NYC 2019.

In 2019 and 2018, Global Goals Week took place concurrently with Climate Week NYC - an event for action, awareness, and accountability for the Sustainable Development Goals. It first took place in 2016. It is often held concurrently with Climate Week NYC.

In 2020 Climate Week NYC allowed people to register online events to be considered as part of the program, will events from around the world being allowed for the first time. Over 500 events registered to be a part of the week making it the largest event to date.

Opening Ceremony

Each year is typically launched with an Opening Ceremony where announcements are made by world leaders from government and business. In 2018 this included a $300 million announcement of support for Pacific Islands affected by climate change from the Prime Minister of New Zealand. Other major participants have included Tim Cook, Richard Branson and John Kerry.

The Hub

In 2018 Climate Week NYC hosted The Hub, a series of events held throughout the second day of the week with talks and debates with people from the climate world. This was expanded in 2019 to cover two days.

10 Things campaign

In 2018 to mark the ten day countdown to Climate Week NYC a ten things campaign (1. travel, 2. fashion, 3. food, 4. water, 5. plastic, 6. lighting, 7. health, 8. electric vehicles, 9. recycling, 10. getting involved) was launched to raise awareness of how the public can engage in tackling climate action. The campaign included a city wide marketing drive across the city, with over 3,000 sites across five boroughs of New York City taking part.

References

2009 establishments in New York City
Climate change conferences
Recurring events established in 2009
Environment of New York City
Environmental organizations based in New York City